Namchuncheon Station (Korean: 남춘천역, meaning South Chuncheon Station, Abbr:Kangwondae Station; 강원대역) is a train station on the Gyeongchun Line in Chuncheon, South Korea, operated by Korail. This station is 78.6 kilometres from its final western destination, Sangbong Station.

History
On July 20, 1939, this station had been operated as the name of Seongsan Station (성산역), however, on April 1, 1940, the name of station has been changed into Namchuncheon Station (남춘천역) and this name has been kept since then. On October 27, 1971, the old station (closed since December 21, 2010) has been built and it lasted almost 40 years. On September 30, 2005, with the kickoff of the construction of new twin-track electronic rapid transit system, this station has been used as the eastern terminus of old Gyeongchun Line, due to the suspension of using Chuncheon Station during that period, and it run successfully until December 20, 2010. A brand-new station has been built, and since December 21, 2010, this station starts operating as the gateway to Chuncheon city. This station is also called as 'Kangwon Nat'l Univ. Station' (강원대역), because the Chuncheon (primary) Campus of Kangwon National University nearly locates from this station.

Current status
With nearly-located Chuncheon Bus Terminal, it also operates as a transport-hub of Chuncheon city. Although, since December 21, 2010 when the electrification and double-tracking of Gyeongchun line to Chuncheon Station has been eventually completed, this station is still busy due to the heavy-populated South Chuncheon (Toegye-dong and Seoksa-dong area; almost half of the city's population) residents, and also incorporates the Seoul Metropolitan Subway system. From about 5am to 11pm, train service has been operated in almost every 20 minutes toward Sangbong, Cheongnyangni, Kwangwoon Univ., Pyeongnaehopyeong and 'express service' (급행열차) is being operated two times only in weekdays.

Station Layout

Facilities near Namchuncheon station
As mentioned, the KNU Chuncheon (main) campus is located, as well as a state-of-the-art digital regional broadcasting centre of Korean Broadcasting System (a.k.a. KBS Chuncheon Broadcasting Branch Office, KBS춘천방송총국), Chuncheon Police Station (춘천경찰서), several shopping centre such as Chuncheon Pungmul Sijang (춘천풍물시장, traditional conventional market, 5-minute-walk), megamall E-mart and Lotte Mart (both of them as 'Chuncheon branch'). Chuncheon Bus Terminal, both intercity and express, also located just about 10 minutes walk from this station.

City transportation
This station also operates its service to Gyeongchun Line's eastern terminus Chuncheon Station, which is located 2.7 km northwest of this station, however, most of local residents and college students seldom use it. Metropolitan bus service from this station toward central business district (Myeong-dong 명동 or Jungang-ro 중앙로, famous for soap series Winter Sonata겨울연가), North (Hupyeong-dong 후평동), Central (Hyoja-dong 효자동), and Southend (Hakgok-ri 학곡리) connects frequently, however, most of South Chuncheon (Toegye and Seoksa) residential area where massively populated, still rarely.

Particular use
On weekends and Fridays, especially during semesters, this train station is heavily used due to the many college students who live outside Chuncheon. Following a new double-track rapid transit system introduced to this (and Chuncheon) station, both numerous mountain-climbing favourites and gourmets from Seoul, typically both are the aged, came to Chuncheon to enjoy their designated trips through one or more days.

See also
 Chuncheon
 Kangwon National University (Chuncheon Campus)
 Chuncheon National University of Education
 Chuncheon Station (abbr.:Hallymdae Station)
 Seoul-Chuncheon Expressway (highway)
 Transportation in South Korea

Seoul Metropolitan Subway stations
Railway stations in Gangwon Province, South Korea
Railway stations opened in 1939
Metro stations in Chuncheon